The 2015–16 Turkish Men's Volleyball League was the 46th edition of the top-flight professional men's volleyball league in Turkey.

Regular season

League table

Results

Play-out

Classification group

Final group

References

External links 
Turkish Volleyball Federastion official web page

Men's
2015 in Turkish sport
2016 in Turkish sport
Turkey